Bradford Cannon (December 2, 1907 – December 20, 2005), the son of Dr. Walter Bradford Cannon, was a pioneer in the field of reconstructive surgery, specialising in burn victims. He was the first chief of plastic and reconstructive surgery at Massachusetts General Hospital and is credited with saving the lives of thousands of soldiers maimed during World War II. As a young doctor, he used a new method he developed with Oliver Cope to treat survivors of the Cocoanut Grove fire in November, 1942.

From 1943 to 1947, Cannon served in the U.S. Army as chief of the plastic surgical section of Valley Forge General Hospital in Pennsylvania, which cared for casualties from Europe and the Pacific. His daughter, Sarah Cannon Holden, said his group performed more than 15,000 operations.

He also served as president of the Boston Surgical Society, the New England Society of Plastic & Reconstructive Surgery, and the American Association of Plastic Surgeons.

In the 1950s, Cannon also worked as a consultant for the U.S. Atomic Energy Commission and visited the Marshall Islands to study effects of radioactivity on the population from atomic tests.

He graduated from Harvard College and Harvard Medical School.

Family
Cannon and his wife Ellen DeNormandie Cannon (died 2003) lived in Lincoln, Massachusetts.

External links
 
 The Bradford Cannon papers can be found at The Center for the History of Medicine at the Countway Library, Harvard Medical School.
 "Bradford Cannon; Pioneered Care for Burns." Obituary, Associated Press, Monday, January 2, 2006

References

1907 births
2005 deaths
United States Army personnel of World War II
American surgeons
Massachusetts General Hospital faculty
People from Lincoln, Massachusetts
United States Army officers
Physicians from Massachusetts
Military personnel from Massachusetts
Harvard College alumni
Harvard Medical School alumni
20th-century surgeons